Vellacott is a surname. Notable people with the surname include:

 Elisabeth Vellacott (1905–2002), English painter
 Maurice Vellacott (born 1955), Canadian politician
 Paul Cairn Vellacott (1891–1954), English schoolteacher
 Philip Vellacott (1907–1997), English classical scholar